Robert Beverley was one of two members of parliament for the rotten borough of Mitchell, Cornwall, during the first parliament of 1553.

References 

Members of the Parliament of England for Mitchell
English MPs 1553 (Edward VI)